Heron Lake can refer to:

 Heron Lake, Minnesota, a small city in the United States
 Heron Lake (Jackson County, Minnesota)
 Heron Lake (New Mexico), a reservoir in Rio Arriba County